Starobikkino (İśke Bikkenä) is a rural locality (a selo) in Chekmagushevsky District, Bashkortostan, Russia. The population was 236 as of 2010. There are 3 streets.

Geography 
Starobikkino is located 15 km south of Chekmagush (the district's administrative centre) by road. Kalmashbashevo is the nearest rural locality.

References 

Rural localities in Chekmagushevsky District